Ethel Mary Partridge, Ethel Mary Mairet RDI, or Ethel Mary Coomaraswamy (17 February 1872 – 18 November 1952) was a British hand loom weaver, significant in the development of the craft during the first half of the twentieth century.

Early life
Ethel Mary Partridge was born in Barnstaple, Devon, in 1872. Her parents were David (a pharmacist) and Mary Ann (born Hunt) Partridge. She was educated locally and in 1899 she qualified to teach piano at the Royal Academy of Music. She then took up work as a governess, first in London and later in Bonn, Germany.

Introduction to textiles

She met the famed art historian and philosopher Ananda Coomaraswamy. The couple married on 19 June 1902 and travelled to Ceylon (now Sri Lanka), where he conducted a mineral survey. The couple recorded the arts and crafts of each village, and Mairet kept meticulous journals, photographing each craft she observed. They returned to England in 1907 and published their investigations into Ceylon crafts.

Until 1910 they lived in Broad Campden where the arts and crafts architect Charles Robert Ashbee had established a community of artists and craftspeople. This Guild and School of Handicraft in Chipping Campden included Ethel's brother Frederick James Partridge, a jeweller. Ashbee renovated a Norman chapel as the Coomaraswamy home. The couple visited India, where they added to the textile collection they had begun whilst in Ceylon.

Weaving and dyeing
Aside from some rudimentary lessons in Ceylon and the British Isles, Ethel Mairet was self-taught as a weaver, spinner and dyer. Many people, including herself, were aware of the fact that, although she was famed for weaving, she was not a very talented weaver.

Mairet made her first experiments with weaving and dyeing in 1909 in Chipping Camden. She studied vegetable dyes in the Bodleian Library, Oxford and is said to have travelled to the Lake District to learn weaving during this period. Her knowledge of dyes and mordants were likely compounded by her father (a chemist) and her husband Ananda Coomaraswamy (a botanist).

Over the winter of 1910 Mairet and Coomaraswamy travelled to India. She wrote to the Ashbees over this period, and kept a journal detailing her discoveries of rare textiles and decorative jewellery, noting the vegetable dyes used.

In 1910 Coomaraswamy began openly having an affair and their marriage ended. Ethel then built a house near Barnstaple complete with studios for textile dyeing and weaving. In 1913 she married Philip Mairet and together they established The Thatched House a joint home and studio near Stratford upon Avon. The studio provided a base for her first weaving workshop. The following year she was visited by Mahatma Gandhi, who knew of her work in Ceylon and was interested in using simple textile techniques in India (see Khadi).

In 1916 she published A Book on Vegetable Dyes printed by Hilary Pepler at the Hampshire House Press in Hammersmith, London.

Ditchling

In 1916 she visited Hilary Pepler in Ditchling. Mairet was so impressed that she set about moving there. In 1917 she completed An Essay on Crafts and Obedience and oversaw the production of the second edition of A Book on Vegetable Dyes, both published by Hilary Pepler at St Dominic's Press in Ditchling.

Gospels, Mairet's third and final building project was completed in late 1920. During the 1930s and 1940s she trained people in weaving and dyeing at her Ditchling studio. Mairet's seminal training at her workshop is said to have influenced all of the aspiring hand weavers of that generation including Hilary Bourne, Valentine KilBride, Elizabeth Peacock, Petra Gill and Peter Collingwood.

The Swiss weaver Marianne Straub came to work with her and to learn more about hand loom weaving; Mairet taught Straub about hand dyeing and spinning as well. Straub introduced a variety of double cloth weaves and developed a friendship with Mairet. Mairet learnt in turn from Straub and this underwrote her belief that hand loom weaving could be used by industry. Straub and Mairet went on three European holidays during the mid 1930s. Straub frequently returned to Mairet and Gospels. A surviving journal written by Mairet from a European journey with her husband in 1927 illustrates how her observations were dominated not by whom she met but what they were wearing.

In 1921 Bernard Leach and Shoji Hamada visited Mairet at Gospels.

A member of both the Red Rose Guild of Craftsmen and the Guild of Weavers, Spinners and Dyers, in 1937 she became the first woman awarded the Royal Society of Arts title of Royal Designer for Industry. In 1939 she published Handweaving Today, Traditions and Change. She taught at the Brighton College of Art from 1939 until 1947.

Mairet remained active throughout her life, and continued mentoring pupils and sending examples of her oeuvre to schools across the country.

Legacy
Mairet died in Ditchling Common in 1952 and she was buried in Brighton, at St Nicholas' churchyard.

Mairet influenced a generation of weavers. The Oxford Dictionary of National Biography quotes the Japanese potter Shoji Hamada who called Mairet "the mother of English hand-weaving". Ditchling Museum of Art + Craft exhibits artifacts related to Mairet and other artists who worked locally.

She is the subject of a biography, A Weaver's Life: Ethel Mairet.

The Ethel Mairet archive is housed at the Crafts Study Centre.  It includes documents and memorabilia from 1872–1952. Personal documents, travel journals 1910–1938. business and personal letters, books of account and photographs are included and are still a subject of academic study.

Published works

References

External links
 
 

1872 births
1952 deaths
Artists from Barnstaple
British weavers
20th-century women textile artists
20th-century textile artists
20th-century English women artists
Alumni of the Royal Academy of Music